Arthur Hamilton Smith, FBA (1860–1941) was a British museum curator and archaeologist.

His brothers were civil servant Henry Babington Smith and MP James Parker Smith.  All three attended Trinity College, Cambridge and were members of the Cambridge Apostles.

Smith was Keeper of Greek and Roman Antiquities at the British Museum from 1909 to 1925. In addition, he served as president of the Society for the Promotion of Hellenic Studies from 1924 to 1929 and director of the British School at Rome from 1928 to 1930 and in 1932.

References

Alumni of Trinity College, Cambridge
British curators
British archaeologists
1860 births
1941 deaths
Companions of the Order of the Bath
Fellows of the British Academy